Kursk Vostochny Airport , also known as Khalino, Kursk-Khalino, is an interceptor aircraft base in Kursk Oblast, Russia, located 7 km east of Kursk. It is a medium-sized base 4 miles northeast of Kursk. Several alert pads, with civilian tarmac on the southern side of the airfield.

Station history

Khalino was home to:
 472nd Fighter Aviation Regiment from 4 October 1979 to 1998. Moved in from Orel, Orel Oblast, where it had been stationed from 1950 to 1979. Equipped with Mikoyan-Gurevich MiG-23P (ASCC: Flogger) or S from 1979. Disbanded 1 May 1998.
 14th Guards Fighter Aviation Regiment (14 Gv IAP) flying Mikoyan MiG-29 (SMT/UBT) (ASCC: Fulcrum) aircraft, having been relocated from Zherdevka (air base). Now part of the 105th Guards Mixed Aviation Division flying the Sukhoi Su-30SM (NATO: Flanker-H).

On 6 December 2022 the airport’s oil storage caught fire. The Kursk governor blamed the fire on a drone strike amid the 2022 Russian invasion of Ukraine.

Airlines and destinations

Statistics

See also

 :ru:472-й истребительный авиационный полк

References

External links

Kursk Airport Official website 

 472nd Fighter Aviation Regiment PVO

Soviet Air Force bases
Soviet Air Defence Force bases
Russian Air Force bases
Airports built in the Soviet Union
Airports in Kursk Oblast